McIvor and MacIvor are anglicised forms of the Irish and Scottish Gaelic Mac Íomhair, meaning "son of Íomhar". Another variant is the surname McKeever.

People with the surname
McIvor
Ashleigh McIvor (born 1983), Canadian freestyle skier
Basil McIvor (1928–2004), Northern Irish Ulster Unionist politician
Dan McIvor, several people
Duncan McIvor, Australian footballer
Hector McIvor (1900–1992), Australian politician
Ivor McIvor (1917–1997), Australian footballer
James McIvor, New Zealand boxer
Jill McIvor (born 1930), Northern Irish public servant, first Northern Irish woman Ombudsman and Commissioner for Complaints
Lois McIvor (1930–2017), New Zealand painter
Rick McIvor (born 1960), American football player
Ron McIvor (born 1951), Scottish football player
Scott McIvor (born 1966), Australian rules footballer
Stephen McIvor (born about 1969), Irish rugby player
Wilbert McIvor, Canadian provincial politician
 William Graham McIvor (1824–1876), Scottish gardener who introduced cinchona in southern India

MacIvor
Daniel MacIvor (born 1962), Canadian actor, playwright, theatre director and film director
John Smith MacIvor (1913-1957), Canadian lawyer and political figure
Rod MacIvor (born 1946), Canadian photojournalist

See also
McIver, variant or similar surname

References

Scottish surnames
Patronymic surnames
Surnames of Irish origin
Anglicised Irish-language surnames